Hannah Wilke (born Arlene Hannah Butter; March 7, 1940 – January 28, 1993) was an American painter, sculptor, photographer, video artist and performance artist. Wilke's work is known for exploring issues of feminism, sexuality and femininity.

Biography
Hannah Wilke was born on March 7, 1940, in New York City to Jewish parents; her grandparents were Eastern European immigrants. She graduated from Great Neck North High School, in Long Island, in 1957. In 1962, she received a Bachelor of Fine Art and a Bachelor of Science in Education from the Tyler School of Art, Temple University, Philadelphia. She taught art in several high schools for approximately 30 years and joined the faculty of the School of Visual Arts. After her graduation the same year she taught art at two high schools. First, Plymouth Meeting, Pennsylvania (1961-1965), between 1965 and 1970 she worked in White Plains, New York. After leaving White Plains, she joined the School of Visual Arts, in New York (1972-1991).

From 1969 to 1977, Wilke was in a relationship with the American Pop artist Claes Oldenburg; they lived, worked and traveled together during that time. Wilke's work was exhibited nationally and internationally throughout her life and continues to be shown posthumously. Solo exhibitions of her work were first mounted in New York and Los Angeles in 1972. Her first full museum exhibition was held at the University of California, Irvine, in 1976, and her first retrospective at the University of Missouri in 1989.

Posthumous retrospectives were held in Copenhagen, Helsinki, and Malmö, Sweden in 2000 and at the Neuberger Museum of Art from 2008 to 2009. Since her death, Wilke's work has been shown in solo gallery shows, group exhibitions, and several surveys of women's art, including WACK! Art and the Feminist Revolution at the Museum of Contemporary Art Los Angeles, Elles at the Centre Georges Pompidou, and Revolution in the Making: Abstract Sculpture by Women, 1947 – 2016 at Hauser & Wirth Los Angeles.

The Hannah Wilke Collection and Archive, Los Angeles was founded in 1999 by Hannah Wilke's sister Marsie Scharlatt and her family, and has been represented by Alison Jacques Gallery, London since 2009.

Her image is included in the iconic 1972 poster Some Living American Women Artists by Mary Beth Edelson.

Early work

Wilke first gained renown with her "vulval" terra-cotta sculptures in the 1960s. Her sculptures, first exhibited in New York in the late 1960s, are often mentioned as some of the first explicit vaginal imagery arising from the women's liberation movement, and they became her signature form which she made in various media, colors and sizes, including large floor installations, throughout her life.  Some of her mediums included clay, chewing gum, kneaded erasers, laundry lint and latex.  The use of unconventional materials is typical of feminist art, nodding to women's historical lack of access to traditional art supplies and education. Further, she reported that the reason she chose chewing gum was because ″It's the perfect metaphor for the American women- chew her up, get what you want out of her, throw her out and pop in a new piece″ Wilke's sculptures were an innovative example of eroticism using a style that combined post-minimalism and feminist aesthetics. A consummate draftswoman, Wilke created numerous drawings, beginning in the early 1960s and continuing throughout her life. In a review of Wilke's drawings at Ronald Feldman Fine Arts in 2010, Thomas Micchelli wrote in The Brooklyn Rail: "at her core, she was a maker of things ... an artist whose sensuality and humor are matched by her formal acumen and tactile rigor."  She performed live and videotaped performance art, beginning in 1974 with Hannah Wilke Super-t-Art, a live performance at the Kitchen, New York, which she also made into an iconic photographic work. Wilke's performances evoke the likes of Simone Forti, Trisha Brown, and Yvonne Rainer. The sculptural art Wilke created, with its unconventional materials and feminist narratives also relates to the work of Louise Bourgeois, Eva Hesse, Alina Szapocznikow, and Niki de St Phalle.

Body art
In 1974, Wilke began work on her photographic body art piece S.O.S — Starification Object Series, in which she merged her minimalist sculpture and her own body by creating tiny vulval sculptures out of chewing gum and sticking them to herself.  She then had herself photographed in various pin-up poses, providing a juxtaposition of glamour and something resembling tribal scarification. Wilke has related the scarring on her body to an awareness of the Holocaust. These poses exaggerate and satirize American cultural values of feminine beauty and fashion and also hint at an interest in ceremonial scarification.  The 50 self-portraits were originally created as a game, "S.O.S.Starificaion Object Series: An Adult Game of Mastication", 1974–75, which Wilke made into an installation that is now in the Centre Pompidou, Paris. She also performed this piece publicly in Paris in 1975, having audience members chew the gum for her before she sculpted them and placed them on papers that she hung on the wall. Wilke also used colored chewing gum as a medium for individual sculptures, using multiple pieces of gum to create a complex layering representing the vulva. Wilke's use of vaginas and vulvas refer to her idea of ″natural womanhood″, in order to support her argument that women are biologically superior. Later on in 1976 she once again conjured the pin-up poses in her self-portrait, Marxism and Art: Beware of Fascist Feminism.

Wilke coined the term "performalist self-portraits" to credit photographers who assisted her, including her father (First Performalist Self-Portrait, 1942–77) and her sister, Marsie (Butter) 
Scharlatt (Arlene Hannah Butter and Cover of Appearances, 1954–77). The title of Wilke's photographic and performance work, So Help Me Hannah, 1979, was taken from a vernacular phrase from the 1930s and '40s and has been interpreted as playing off of the Jewish mother stereotype and referencing Wilke's relationship with her mother.

Besides Hannah Wilke Super-t-Art, 1974, other well-known performances in which Wilke used her body include Gestures, 1974; Hello Boys, 1975; Intercourse with ...  (audio installation) 1974–1976; Intercourse with ...  (video) 1976; and Hannah Wilke Through the Large Glass performed at the Philadelphia Museum of Art in 1977.

Death and Intra-Venus

Hannah Wilke died in Houston, Texas, in 1993 from lymphoma. Her last work, Intra-Venus (1992–1993), is a posthumously published photographic record of her physical transformation and deterioration resulting from chemotherapy and bone marrow transplant.  The photographs, which were taken by her husband Donald Goddard whom she had lived with since 1982 and married in 1992 shortly before her death, confront the viewer with personal images of Wilke progressing from midlife happiness to bald, damaged, and resigned. Intra-Venus mirrors her photo diptych Portrait of the Artist with Her Mother, Selma Butter, 1978–82, which portrayed her mother's struggles with breast cancer and "having literally incorporated her mother, illness and all."  Intra-Venus was exhibited and published posthumously partially in response to Wilke's feelings that clinical procedures hide patients as if dying were a "personal shame".

The Intra Venus works also include watercolor Face and Hand drawings, Brushstrokes, a series of drawings made
from her own hair and the Intra Venus Tapes, a 16-channel videotape installation.

Pose and narcissism
Wilke often features herself as a posing glamour model. Her use of self in photography and performance art, however, has been interpreted as a celebration and validation of Self, Women, the Feminine, and Feminism. Conversely, it has also been described as an artistic deconstruction of cultural modes of female vanity, narcissism, and beauty.

Wilke referred to herself as a feminist artist from the beginning. The art critic Ann-Sargent Wooster said that Wilke's identification with the feminist movement was confusing because of her beauty — her self-portraitures looked more like a Playboy centerfold than the typical feminist nudes. According to Wooster,

The problem Wilke faced in being taken seriously is that she was conventionally beautiful and her beauty and self-absorbed narcissism distracted you from her reversal of the voyeurism inherent in women as sex objects. In her photographs of herself as a goddess, a living incarnation of great works of art or as a pin-up, she wrested the means of production of the female image from male hands and put them in her own.

If critics found Wilke's beauty an impediment to understanding her work, this changed in the early 1990s when Wilke began documenting the decay of her body ravaged by lymphoma. Wilke's use of self-portraiture has been explored in detail in writing about her last photographic series, Intra Venus.

Wilke once answered the critics who commented on her body being too beautiful for her work by saying "People give me this bullshit of, 'What would you have done if you weren't so gorgeous?' What difference does it make? ... Gorgeous people die as do the stereotypical 'ugly.' Everybody dies."

Critical recognition
During her lifetime, Wilke was widely exhibited and received critical praise while also being viewed as controversial. However, until recently, museums were hesitant to acquire work by women artists who, including Wilke, engaged in protests decrying their lack of inclusion during the feminist movement of the 1970s. While still alive, Wilke's work was in a few permanent collections, showcasing the confrontational use of the female sexuality. Since her death, Wilke's work has been acquired for the permanent collections of The Museum of Modern Art, New York, the Whitney Museum of American Art, New York, Los Angeles County Museum of Art, Museum of Contemporary Art, Los Angeles, and in European museums such as the Centre Pompidou, Paris.

Solo exhibitions
1976, Fine Arts Gallery, University of California, Irvine
1978, MoMA PS1, Long Island City, New York
1979, Washington Project for the Arts, Washington, DC
1989, Gallery 210, University of Missouri, St Louis
1998, Hannah Wilke: A Retrospective, Nikolaj Contemporary Art Center, Copenhagen (traveling exhibition)
2000, Uninterrupted Career: Hannah Wilke 1940–1993, Neue Gesellschaft für bildende Kunst, Berlin
2006, Exchange Values, Artium- Centro Museo Vasco de Arte Contemporaneo, Vitoria-Gasteiz, Spain
2008, Hannah Wilke: Gestures, Neuberger Museum of Art, Purchase, New York
2021, Hannah Wilke: Art for Life’s Sake, Pulitzer Arts Foundation, St. Louis

Awards 
She received a Creative Artists Public Service Grant (1973); National Endowment for the Arts Grants (1987, 1980, 1979, 1976); Pollack-Krasner Foundation Grants (1992, 1987); a Guggenheim Fellowship (1982), and an International Association of Art Critics Award (1993).

Collections 
Wilke's work is held in the following permanent collections:
 Brooklyn Museum
 Albright-Knox Art Gallery, Buffalo, NY
 Des Moines Art Center 
 Tate, U.K.
 Los Angeles County Museum of Art
 Museo Nacional Centro de Arte Reina Sofía, Madrid, Spain
 Walker Arts Center, Minneapolis, MN
 Yale University Art Gallery, New Haven, CT 
 Jewish Museum, New York, NY
 Metropolitan Museum of Art, New York, NY
 Solomon R. Guggenheim Museum, New York, NY
 Whitney Museum of American Art, New York, NY
 Allen Memorial Art Museum, Oberlin, OH
 Centre Georges Pompidou, Paris, France
 Princeton University Art Museum, Princeton, NJ
 David Winton Bell Gallery, Brown University, Providence, RI
 Nevada Museum of Art, Reno, NV
 Rose Art Museum, Brandeis University, Waltham, MA
University of Michigan Museum of Art, Ann Arbor, MI

References

External links

Nancy Princenthal, Hannah Wilke (Prestel USA, 2010)
! Woman art revolution, Documentary trailer shows rare footage of Wilke speaking in 1991, less than two years before her death. The trailer also shows examples of her Intra-Venus series: portraits of her body ravaged by lymphoma.

American conceptual artists
Women conceptual artists
Conceptual photographers
Feminist artists
1940 births
1993 deaths
Artists from New York City
Modern sculptors
Jewish American artists
Temple University Tyler School of Art alumni
20th-century American photographers
20th-century American sculptors
Burials at Green River Cemetery
Jewish feminists
20th-century American women photographers
American feminists
American women sculptors
Deaths from lymphoma
Postminimalist artists
20th-century American Jews